Mianzulan (also Romanized as Mīānzūlan and Mīān Zūlān; also known as Mūzelān) is a village in Avarzaman Rural District, Samen District, Malayer County, Hamadan Province, Iran. At the 2006 census, its population was 188, in 51 families.

References 

Populated places in Malayer County